This is a list of Australian television-related events in 1976.

Events
 1 January  –  Australian children's television series The Lost Islands screens on The 0-10 Network. Co-produced by The 0-10 Network and Paramount Pictures and distributed by CBS Television, the series had a modest following in Australia, but was sold well to oversea markets such as the UK, Canada, the United States, France, New Zealand, Israel, South Africa, West Germany, Italy, Sri Lanka and various parts of Europe, like The Netherlands.
 9 February – Australian game show The Celebrity Game returns to The 0-10 Network with a brand new, revamped version. The original host of the series, Bert Newton, is replaced by English actor and singer Mike Preston.
 15 April – Two American sitcoms, Welcome Back, Kotter and Barney Miller, both air on Seven Network on the same day.
 July – ABC, Seven Network and Nine Network have combined forces to provide the coverage of the Olympic Games from Montreal, Quebec. The opening and closing ceremonies are telecast live, with highlights packages screening each evening.
 12 July – Australian wildlife series In the Wild presented by Harry Butler debuts on ABC.
 2 August – A brand new Australian youth pop program called Flashez hosted by Ray Burgess and Mike Meade premieres on ABC.
 2 August – Australian police drama Bluey debuts on Seven Network.
 13 August – Australian sitcom Alvin Purple, based on the two sex movies, premieres on ABC.
 3 September – Australian prison comedy series The Bluestone Boys makes it premiere on The 0-10 Network. The series only ran for a total of 26 episodes and was cancelled as it was not particularly successful.
 5 November – Chopper Squad an Australian drama series premieres on The 0-10 Network.
 8 November – A brand new Australia hospital drama from Grundy Organisation The Young Doctors screens on Nine Network. It was later broadcast in various different countries such as the UK, USA, France, Spain and Ireland.
 15 November – Crawford Productions's brand new WWII Australian drama television series The Sullivans premieres on Nine Network.
 25 November – Final episode of the Australian sitcom Alvin Purple is broadcast on the ABC.
 26 November – RTS5A is launched, serving Loxton, Renmark and the Riverland in South Australia.
 November – Mike Walsh has announced that he will be moving his own daytime show from The 0-10 Network to Nine Network starting from early 1977.
 1 December – Final episode of the Australian children's series The Lost Islands airs on The 0-10 Network.
 The 0-10 Network airs the final episode of its Australian police drama series Matlock Police.

Debuts

New International Programming
 2 January –  Swiss Family Robinson (1974) (ABC)
 22 January –  S.W.A.T. (Nine Network)
 9 February –  Partridge Family 2200 A.D. (Seven Network)
 9 February –  The Invisible Man (1975) (Nine Network)
 9 February –  Starsky and Hutch (Nine Network)
 17 February –  Switch (The 0-10 Network)
 25 March –  Wodehouse Playhouse (ABC)
 6 April –  Chico and the Man (The 0-10 Network)
 15 April –  Welcome Back, Kotter (Seven Network)
 15 April –  Barney Miller (Seven Network)
 26 April –  Laverne and Shirley (Nine Network)
 17 May –  Doctor on the Go (Seven Network)
 20 June/4 September –  Westwind (20 June: The 0-10 Network - Melbourne, 4 September: The 0-10 Network - Sydney)
 22 June –  The Dumplings (The 0-10 Network)
 22 June –  The Bob Crane Show (The 0-10 Network)
 15 July –  Barbary Coast (The 0-10 Network)
 24 July –  Bert D'Angelo/Superstar (Seven Network)
 2 August –  Lorne Greene's Last of the Wild (ABC)
 3 August –  Microbes and Men (ABC)
 8 August –  How Green Was My Valley (ABC)
 8 September –  The Liver Birds (ABC)
 1 November –  The Hilarious House of Frightenstein (The 0-10 Network)
 4 November –  I Didn't Know You Cared (ABC)
 7 November –  Fay (Nine Network)
 7 November –  Three for the Road (The 0-10 Network)
 9 November –  Space: 1999 (Seven Network)
 9 November –  Wait Till Your Father Gets Home (Seven Network)
 9 November –  On the Rocks (Seven Network)
 10 November –  Carry on Laughing (Seven Network)
 10 November –  Doc (Seven Network)
 10 November –  Father Brown (Seven Network)
 8 December –  The Adventures of Sir Prancelot (ABC)
 14 December –  Notorious Woman (The 0-10 Network)
 20 December –  Days of Hope (ABC)
 29 December –  The Lotus Eaters (ABC)
  The New Scooby-Doo Movies (Nine Network)

Television shows

1950s
Mr. Squiggle and Friends (1959–1999).

1960s
Four Corners (1961–present).
It's Academic (1968–1978).

1970s
Super Flying Fun Show (1970–1979).
Hey Hey It's Saturday (1971–1999, 2009–2010).
Young Talent Time (1971–1988).
Matlock Police (1971–1976).
Spyforce (1971–1976).
A Current Affair (1971–1978).
Countdown (1974–1987).
Rush (1974–1976).
The Last of the Australians (1975–1976).
The Don Lane Show (1975–1983).
This Is Your Life (1975–1980).
The Lost Islands (1976).
Flashez (1976–1977).
In the Wild (1976–1981).
The Celebrity Game (1976–1977).
Alvin Purple (1976).
Bluey (1976–1977).

Ending this year

See also
 1976 in Australia
 List of Australian films of 1976

References